Hotel Ground Zero (titled The 9/11 Hotel in the UK) is an American television documentary special that premiered on September 11, 2009 on the History channel, marking the eighth anniversary of the event. The program features the overshadowed story of the Marriott World Trade Center (3 WTC) on the day of the 2001 attacks, resulting in its destruction caused by the collapse of the adjacent South Tower followed by the North Tower, as told by people who had escaped from the hotel.

See also
9/11: The Twin Towers (2006 BBC docudrama, also called Inside the Twin Towers)
102 Minutes That Changed America (September 11, 2008, TV special)
102 Minutes: The Untold Story of the Fight to Survive Inside the Twin Towers (2006 book)
The Miracle of Stairway B (2006 TV special)
 September 11 attacks
 World Trade Center (1973–2001)

References

External links

History (American TV channel) original programming
Documentary films about the September 11 attacks
American documentary television films
Films about high-rise fires